Jamie Pickett (born August 29, 1988) is an American mixed martial artist who competes in the Middleweight division of the Ultimate Fighting Championship.

Background
Pickett lived with his grandparents growing up in Chinquapin, North Carolina, due to his father being in prison and his mom, a drug user, leaving the family when he was young. His mother returned for Pickett and his two half brothers when he was eight, however she was still using drugs. The government eventually got involved, and after a battle in court, Pickett ended up living with his father's parents, while his two half-brothers lived with his mom's parents, beginning at the age of nine or ten. Pickett initially started training Brazilian jiu-jitsu at the age of 19 and dabbled into mixed martial arts in 2009. Jamie ended up dropping out of high school at East Duplin High School in North Carolina

Mixed martial arts career

Early career
Making his professional debut at Conflick Cage Fighting  against Tyler Minton, Pickett lost the bout via unanimous decision. Pickett then defeated Brian McGinnis via TKO in the first round at Charity Fight Round 1, followed by a loss to Joshua Williams via second-round rear-naked choke at Warfare 9: Apocalypse. Pickett defeated his next six opponents, with the first five coming by stoppages, culminating in Pickett defeating Rashawn Spencer via unanimous decision at Conflict MMA 42 Charlotte.

Pickett appeared in Dana White's Tuesday Night Contender Series Dana White's Contender Series 1 web-series program on July 11, 2017, facing Charles Byrd. He lost the fight via a technical submission in round one.

At the 864 Fighting Championship, Pickett defeated Crishian Torres via TKO in the first round. He defeated Elijah Gobille via TKO in round one at Next Level Fight Club 10.

Pickett was invited onto Dana White's Contender Series 17 on June 18, 2019, where he faced Punahele Soriano. He lost the bout via unanimous decision.

At NLFC 11 Pickett defeated Jacquis Williams via unanimous decision.

Headlining Dana White's Contender Series 30, he defeated Jhonven Pati via TKO in the second round, earning a UFC contract.

Ultimate Fighting Championship
In his promotional debut, Pickett faced Tafon Nchukwi at UFC Fight Night: Thompson vs. Neal on December 19, 2020. He lost the bout via unanimous decision.

Pickett faced Jordan Wright on May 15, 2021, at UFC 262. He lost the bout via TKO in the first round.

Pickett was scheduled to face Laureano Staropoli on October 9, 2021, at UFC Fight Night: Dern vs. Rodriguez. However, after one of his coaches tested positive for COVID-19, the bout was moved to October 23 at UFC Fight Night: Costa vs. Vettori. Pickett won the fight via unanimous decision.

Pickett was scheduled to face Caio Borralho on January 15, 2022 at UFC on ESPN 32.  Borralho pulled out of the bout due to unknown reasons and was replaced by promotional newcomer Joseph Holmes. Pickett won the fight via unanimous decision.

In a quick turn around, Pickett faced Kyle Daukaus, replacing Julian Marquez, on February 19, 2022 at UFC Fight Night 201. He lost the bout via d'arce choke in the first round.

Pickett was scheduled to face Abdul Razak Alhassan on July 9, 2022 at UFC on ESPN 39. However, Alhassan pulled out of the bout and was replaced by Denis Tiuliulin. The bout was removed from the card for undisclosed reasons and moved to UFC 279. Pickett lost the fight via TKO in the second round.

Pickett was scheduled to face Bo Nickal on December 10, 2022 at UFC 282. However, it was announced in late October that Nickal withdrew due to injury and the bout was scrapped. The pair was rescheduled to meet on March 4, 2023 at UFC 285. He lost the fight via an arm-triangle choke submission in the first round. Following the fight, Pickett's manager announced plans to appeal the fight to Nevada State Athletic Commission on the grounds that Nickal took advantage of an uncalled groin shot to win the fight.

Championships and accomplishments

Mixed martial arts 
 Next Level Fight Club
 NLFC Middleweight Championship (One Time)
 Two successful title defenses

Mixed martial arts record

|-
|Loss
|align=center|13–9
|Bo Nickal
|Submission (arm-triangle choke)
|UFC 285
|
|align=center|1
|align=center|2:54
|Las Vegas, Nevada, United States
|
|-
|Loss
|align=center|13–8
|Denis Tiuliulin
|TKO (knees and punches)
|UFC 279
|
|align=center|2
|align=center|4:52
|Las Vegas, Nevada, United States
|
|-
|Loss
|align=center|13–7
|Kyle Daukaus
|Submission (brabo choke)
|UFC Fight Night: Walker vs. Hill
|
|align=center|1
|align=center|4:59
|Las Vegas, Nevada, United States
|
|-
|  Win
|align=center|13–6
|Joseph Holmes
| Decision (unanimous)
|UFC on ESPN: Kattar vs. Chikadze
|
|align=center|3
|align=center|5:00
|Las Vegas, Nevada, United States
|
|-
|  Win
| align=center|12–6
| Laureano Staropoli
| Decision (unanimous)  
| UFC Fight Night: Costa vs. Vettori
| 
| align=center|3
| align=center|5:00
| Las Vegas, Nevada, United States
|
|-
| Loss
| align=center|11–6
| Jordan Wright
|TKO (elbows and punches)
|UFC 262
|
|align=center|1
|align=center|1:04
|Houston, Texas, United States
| 
|-
| Loss
| align=center|11–5
|Tafon Nchukwi
|Decision (unanimous)
|UFC Fight Night: Thompson vs. Neal
|
|align=center|3
|align=center|5:00
|Las Vegas, Nevada, United States
|
|-
|Win
|align=center| 11–4
|Jhonoven Pati
|TKO (punches)
|Dana White's Contender Series 30
|
|align=center| 2
|align=center| 0:33
|Las Vegas, Nevada, United States
|
|-
| Win
| align=center| 10–4
|Jaquis Williams
|Decision (unanimous)
|Next Level Fight Club 11
|
|align=center|3
|align=center|5:00
|Greenville, North Carolina, United States
|
|-
| Loss
| align=center|9–4
| Punahele Soriano
|Decision (unanimous)
| Dana White's Contender Series 17
| 
| align=center| 3
| align=center| 5:00
| Las Vegas, Nevada, United States
|
|-
| Win
| align=center| 9–3
|Elijah Gbollie, Jr.
| TKO (strikes)
| Next Level Fight Club 10
| 
| align=center| 1
| align=center| 4:32
| Greenville, North Carolina, United States
|
|-
| Win
| align=center|8–3
| Cristhian Torres
| TKO (doctor stoppage)
| 864 Fighting Championship: Fight 4
| 
| align=center| 1
| align=center| 3:03
| Greenville, North Carolina, United States
| 
|-
| Loss
| align=center|7–3
| Charles Byrd
|Technical Submission (arm-triangle choke)
|Dana White's Contender Series 1
|
|align=center|1
|align=center|4:55
|Las Vegas, Nevada, United States
|
|-
| Win
| align=center|7–2
| Rashaun Spencer
| Decision (unanimous)
|Conflict MMA 42
|
|align=center|3
|align=center|5:00
|Indian Trail, North Carolina, United States
| 
|-
| Win
| align=center| 6–2
| Doug Usher
| KO (punch)
| Legacy FC 47
| 
| align=center| 2
| align=center| 2:32
| Atlanta, Georgia, United States
| 
|-
| Win
| align=center| 5–2
| Marcus Finch
|TKO (punches)
|Next Level Fight Club 3
|
|align=center| 3
|align=center| 4:41
|Greenville, North Carolina, United States
|
|-
| Win
| align=center| 4–2
|Savalas Williams
|TKO (punches)
|Next Level Fight Club 2
|
|align=center|1
|align=center|2:42
|Greenville, North Carolina, United States
|
|-
| Win
| align=center| 3–2
|Nick Poythress
| TKO
| Next Level Fight Club 1
| 
| align=center| 2
| align=center| 1:16
| Greenville, North Carolina, United States
| 
|-
| Win
| align=center| 2–2
| Jason Fann
|Submission (punches)
|The Truth Event
|
|align=center|1
|align=center|2:00
|Greenville, North Carolina, United States
|
|-
| Loss
| align=center|1–2
| Joshua Williams
|Submission (rear-naked choke)
|Warfare 9: Apocalypse
|
| align=center|2
| align=center|1:59
|North Myrtle Beach, South Carolina, United States
|
|-
| Win
| align=center| 1–1
| Brian McGinnis
| TKO (doctor stoppage)
|Charity Fight: Round 1
|
| align=center|1
| align=center|3:50
|Kenansville, North Carolina, United States
|
|-
| Loss
| align=center|0–1
| Tyler Minton
| Decision (unanimous)
| Conflick Cage Fighting
|
|align=center|3
|align=center|5:00
|Raleigh, North Carolina, United States
|

See also 
 List of current UFC fighters
 List of male mixed martial artists

References

External links 
  
 

1988 births
Living people
American male mixed martial artists
Middleweight mixed martial artists
Mixed martial artists utilizing Brazilian jiu-jitsu
Ultimate Fighting Championship male fighters
American practitioners of Brazilian jiu-jitsu
Mixed martial artists from North Carolina